Spiraea salicifolia, the bridewort, willow-leaved meadowsweet, spice hardhack, or Aaron's beard, is a species of flowering plant in the family Rosaceae. A shrub, it is native to east-central Europe, Kazakhstan, all of Siberia, the Russian Far East, Mongolia, northern China, Korea, and Japan, and it has been widely introduced to the rest of Europe and to eastern North America. It has been cultivated since the 1500s for hedges and similar applications, but is not particularly well-behaved.

Subtaxa
The following varieties are accepted:
Spiraea salicifolia var. grosseserrata  – Manchuria
Spiraea salicifolia var. salicifolia – Entire range

References

salicifolia
Ornamental plants
Flora of Poland
Flora of Czechoslovakia
Flora of Austria
Flora of Hungary
Flora of Yugoslavia
Flora of Romania
Flora of Bulgaria
Flora of Ukraine
Flora of Siberia
Flora of the Russian Far East
Flora of Kazakhstan
Flora of Mongolia
Flora of Inner Mongolia
Flora of North-Central China
Flora of Manchuria
Flora of Korea
Flora of Japan
Taxa named by Carl Linnaeus
Plants described in 1753